Akila Isanka (born 15 January 1989) is a Sri Lankan cricketer. He made his first-class debut for Sri Lanka Air Force Sports Club in the 2009–10 Premier Trophy on 2 October 2009.

References

External links
 

1989 births
Living people
Sri Lankan cricketers
Saracens Sports Club cricketers
Sri Lanka Air Force Sports Club cricketers
Cricketers from Colombo